Nikos Psimopoulos (born 19 June 2003) is a Greek professional footballer who plays as a goalkeeper for Super League 2 club Ergotelis.

References

2003 births
Living people
Greece youth international footballers
Super League Greece 2 players
Ergotelis F.C. players
Association football goalkeepers
Footballers from Heraklion
Greek footballers